Lost in the Stars: The Music of Kurt Weill is a 1985 tribute album to German-American composer Kurt Weill. It was executive-produced by Hal Willner and John Telfer, and produced by Hal Willner and Paul M. Young.

Track listing

Original release

CD re-release 

The CD re-release contains these additional tracks:
 "The Great Hall" – Henry Threadgill
 "Johnny's Speech" – Van Dyke Parks
 "Klops Lied" (Meatball Song) – Elliott Sharp
 "Hurricane Introduction" – Mark Bingham

References

1985 compilation albums
Albums produced by Hal Willner
A&M Records compilation albums
Kurt Weill tribute albums